Double Trouble (寶島雙雄) is a 2012 Taiwanese action comedy film directed by David Chang and starring Jaycee Chan and Xia Yu.

Cast
 Jaycee Chan
 Xia Yu
 Jessica Cambensy
 Amber Ann
 Vivian Dawson
 Chen Han-dian

References

External links

 Double Trouble Review at HK Neo Reviews

2012 action comedy films
2012 films
2012 comedy films
Taiwanese action comedy films